Robertson v. United States, 343 U.S. 711 (1952), was a United States Supreme Court case in which the Court held that cash contest prizes are taxable, and attributable to the most-recent thirty-six months ending with the close of the year in which it was received.

Background 
The facts of the case involve American composer Leroy Robertson entering a previously composed symphony, Trilogy, into a 1947 contest for musical compositions.  Robertson won $25,000, claimed the prize on his income taxes as income attributable to the three years he wrote it (1937 through 1939), and thereafter claimed a refund that treated his winnings as a gift.

The case is notable, and thus appears in law school casebooks, for the following holdings:

 A cash prize received by the winner of a contest in musical composition is "gross income" within the meaning of § 22(a) of the Internal Revenue Code, and it is not a "gift" excluded from gross income by § 22(b)(3).
 In computing under § 107(b), the tax on such a cash prize for a musical composition, the income should be attributed to the 36 months ending with the close of the year in which it was received—not some earlier period of 36 months during which the taxpayer worked on the composition.

References

External links

United States Supreme Court cases
United States Supreme Court cases of the Vinson Court
United States taxation and revenue case law
1952 in United States case law